The following television shows are set in the U.S. state of Wisconsin:

Adventure in Dairyland (set in Madison)
Agents of S.H.I.E.L.D. (set in Milwaukee and several fictional cities)
Aliens in America (set in Chippewa Falls)
American Dreamer (set in Kenosha)
The George Wendt Show (set in Madison)
Happy Days (set in suburban Milwaukee)
Laverne & Shirley (set in Milwaukee)
Liv & Maddie (set in Stevens Point)
Raising Miranda (set in Racine)
Step by Step (set in Port Washington)
A Whole New Ballgame (set in Milwaukee)
’’Supernatural’’ (multiple episodes set in various Wisconsin towns including episodes based in Milwaukee and Madison)

Television shows set in fictional cities in Wisconsin
ChalkZone (set in fictional Plainsville)
Life with Louie (set in fictional Cedar Knoll)
A Minute With Stan Hooper (set in fictional Waterford Falls)
My Talk Show (set in fictional Derbyville)
Picket Fences (set in a fictional town of Rome, although there are two towns of Rome in Wisconsin, one in Adams County and the other in Jefferson County)
That '70s Show (set in the fictional Point Place, a suburb of Kenosha, Wisconsin)
The Young and the Restless (set in a fictional Genoa City, although there is a real town of Genoa City, Wisconsin; It also make references to Waukesha County, Wisconsin in several storylines)

 
Television shows set in
Mass media in Wisconsin
Wisconsin